Valley Vista High School is a high school in Surprise, Arizona under the jurisdiction of the Dysart Unified School District.

Sports teams

References

Public high schools in Arizona
Educational institutions established in 2006
Schools in Maricopa County, Arizona
Education in Surprise, Arizona
2006 establishments in Arizona